Il seduttore (translation: The Seducer) is a 1954 Italian comedy film directed by Franco Rossi. It was adapted from the play by Diego Fabbri.

Plot  
Alberto is forced to face his wife and his two lovers at the same time.

Cast 

 Alberto Sordi: Alberto
 Lea Padovani: Norma
 Lia Amanda: Natalina Spencer 
 Jacqueline Pierreux: Jacqueline
 Denise Grey: Jacqueline's Mother
 Mino Doro: Commendatore
 Ciccio Barbi: Ragionier Abele 
 Pina Bottin: Giulia 
 Nino Vingelli: Onofrio 
 Eva Vanicek:Alberto's Young Colleague  
 Mara Berni: Blonde Colleague on the Train 
 Riccardo Cucciolla: Racca  
 Ennio Girolami: Singer

References

External links

1954 films
1954 comedy films
Italian comedy films
Films directed by Franco Rossi
Adultery in films
Italian black-and-white films
1950s Italian films